Arthragrostis is a genus of Australian plants in the grass family, found only in Queensland.

 Species
 Arthragrostis aristispicula B.K.Simon
 Arthragrostis brassiana B.K.Simon
 Arthragrostis clarksoniana B.K.Simon
 Arthragrostis deschampsioides (Domin) Lazarides

See also 
 List of Poaceae genera

References 

Poaceae genera
Flora of Queensland
Panicoideae